Aaron Lewis (born April 13, 1972) is an American musician who is best known as the lead vocalist, rhythm guitarist and founding member of the nu metal band Staind, with whom he released seven studio albums. Since 2010, he has pursued a solo career in country music with his debut EP, Town Line, which was released in 2011. Lewis's first full-length solo release, The Road, was released by Blaster Records in 2012.

In 2006, Lewis was ranked at number 49 in the "Top 100 Heavy Metal Vocalists" by Hit Parader.

Early life 
Lewis was born in Rutland, Vermont, to a Jewish mother and a Catholic father of Italian, English and Welsh descent. At the time of his birth, his parents were living in a log cabin. Lewis moved to New Hampshire when he was 8, and lived there until he was 12. When his parents split up, he moved with his father to Longmeadow, Massachusetts, where he attended Longmeadow High School. He also lived in Forest Park, Springfield, Massachusetts.

Career

Solo career 
In July 2010, Lewis finished recording a country music EP entitled Town Line that was released on March 1, 2011, via Stroudavarious Records. It features seven tracks including three versions of the first single "Country Boy" featuring George Jones, Charlie Daniels, and Chris Young, as well as the songs "Massachusetts", "Vicious Circles", "The Story Never Ends", and a re-recording of "Tangled Up in You" originally from The Illusion of Progress. Lewis said in a July 2011 interview that he was introduced to country music as a child by his grandfather, but his interest was recently rekindled when he toured with fellow rock turned occasional country singer Kid Rock. 

Lewis released his first full solo album, The Road, in November 2012. Its debut single, "Endless Summer", has also made the country charts.  Lewis wrote every song on the ten track collection, except for "Granddaddy's Gun" which was penned by Dallas Davidson, Rhett Akins and Bobby Pinson, marking the first time Lewis has recorded outside material for an album. In an interview with Broadway's Electric Barnyard, Lewis said he recorded "Granddaddy's Gun" as both a compliment to a friend, and because he was pressed for time.

Lewis wrote songs for his second solo album whilst touring in support of The Road, often performing with Katz Von Brunenburg in his live sets. The album, dubbed Sinner, was mostly recorded in a single 18 hour session, with many tracks done in one take. Aaron's daughter Zoe also provides guest vocals on one song.

On April 12, 2019, Lewis released his third solo album, State I'm In.

On July 4, 2021, he released "Am I the Only One", a song protesting America's leadership and left-wing activists. 

On October 21, 2021, Lewis released "Goodbye Town" and also announced that he would release his fourth solo album Frayed at Both Ends on January 28, 2022.

Collaborations 
Lewis was featured on the song "No Sex" by Limp Bizkit on their album Significant Other. He was also featured on a remix of the song "Crawling" on Linkin Park's first remix album Reanimation (titled as "Krwlng" on the remix album). He contributed vocals to the song "Follow" by Sevendust from Animosity, and to the songs "Bleed" and "Send in the Clowns" by the band Cold from 13 Ways to Bleed on Stage. He's also featured on Jimmie's Chicken Shack's song "Falling Out", the only single off their 2004 album re.present. In December 2010, while promoting his Town Line album, Lewis collaborated with Corey Taylor for a one-night-only acoustic duet show covering songs such as Pearl Jam's "Black", Pink Floyd's "Comfortably Numb", and Alice in Chains' "Down in a Hole".

Personal life 
Married to Vanessa Lewis, they have three daughters. Regarding the commercial success of Staind's albums in the early 2000s, Lewis reflected, "A lot of other people made a shit load of money but we're the same as any of you. I have to work to pay my bills."

In a five-minute interview with Outdoor Life magazine, Lewis said that he has been hunting whitetail deer since he was old enough to keep up in the "good old woods", around age four or five. He prefers to hunt deer with a compound or recurve bow, and he occasionally utilizes a muzzleloader.

Lewis has been open about his struggles with substance abuse and mental health issues, writing about his problems in Staind songs and his country music.

Politics 
Lewis supported Donald Trump before the United States presidential election of 2016, although he said he was disappointed with his "bickering and name-calling". His last tours, from 2019 and 2020, featured him wearing a Make America Great Again cap.

Lewis has been outspoken in his opposition to the COVID-19 vaccine and mask mandates.

Philanthropy 
On November 4, 2006, Lewis performed at his old high school in Longmeadow, Massachusetts, and gave all the proceeds to the music department to fund the department's expenses to buy new equipment and supplies. Lewis's main focus, however, is the non-profit organization It Takes a Community, where he and his wife have started to reopen their daughters' elementary school in Worthington, Massachusetts.

Discography

Studio albums

Extended plays

Singles

Music videos

Awards and nominations

References

External links 
 
 The Darkness Within by Jenny Eliscu, Rolling Stone, July 19, 2001 (In depth interview, includes birthplace)
 Aaron Lewis lyrics

1972 births
Living people
Alternative metal musicians
American country rock singers
American country singer-songwriters
American heavy metal guitarists
American heavy metal singers
American libertarians
American male singer-songwriters
American people of English descent
American people of Italian descent
American people of Welsh descent
American baritones
American rock songwriters
Jewish American musicians
Jewish heavy metal musicians
Massachusetts Republicans
Musicians from Springfield, Massachusetts
Singers from Vermont
Nu metal singers
People from Rutland (city), Vermont
R&J Records artists
Singer-songwriters from Massachusetts
Songwriters from Vermont
Guitarists from Vermont
Guitarists from Massachusetts
American male guitarists
American hunters
American fishers
Staind members
21st-century American singers
21st-century American guitarists
Country musicians from Massachusetts
21st-century American male singers
21st-century American Jews